Bandakagni-Tomora (also spelled Bandakanyi-Tomoura) is a town in eastern Ivory Coast. It is a sub-prefecture of Sandégué Department in Gontougo Region, Zanzan District.

Bandakagni-Tomora was a commune until March 2012, when it became one of 1126 communes nationwide that were abolished.

In 2014, the population of the sub-prefecture of Bandakagni-Tomora was 7,159.

Villages
The six villages of the sub-prefecture of Bandakagni-Tomora and their population in 2014 are:
 Bandakagni-Tomora (2 969)
 Doutiguidougou (1 774)
 Kouadio-Koto (972)
 Kouassidougou (1 203)
 Namassi (2 237)
 Tiéoulékro (125)

Notes

Sub-prefectures of Gontougo
Former communes of Ivory Coast